Erica von Kleist is a jazz flautist, saxophonist, and composer. She is a descendant of the Pomeranian Prussian noble family von Kleist. As an educator, She has taught privately for over 15 years. She has released three albums as a bandleader – Project E in 2005, Erica von Kleist & No Exceptions in 2009 and Alpine Clarity in 2014

Music career
Von Kleist was born in Connecticut and took piano lessons at the age of five. When she was nine, she became interested in the flute after hearing music from the movie The Little Mermaid. She went to Hall High School in West Hartford, CT, a school famous for its strong Jazz program, and was part of the jazz band when it won the Essentially Ellington Competition at Jazz at Lincoln Center.

Von Kleist went to the Manhattan School of Music, then Juilliard, graduating in 2004. She toured with the Afro Latin Jazz Orchestra and appeared on two of their albums which were nominated for Grammy Awards. She has performed or recorded with Wynton Marsalis and the Jazz at Lincoln Center Orchestra, Darcy James Argue's Secret Society, and Seth MacFarlane. Her debut album was Project E (2005), followed by Erica von Kleist and No Exceptions (2010), and Alpine Clarity (2014). In 2012, she left New York City and moved to Montana, where she performs, records, teaches, and runs two businesses.

As an educator, von Kleist has participated in Horns to Havana, which gives musical instruments to students in Cuba.

Awards
 ASCAP Young Jazz Composer’s Award
 Martin E. Segal Award from Lincoln Center

Discography

With Chris Potter
Song for Anyone (Sunnyside, 2007)

References

External links
 Artist's website

Women jazz saxophonists
Living people
1949 births
American jazz saxophonists
American women jazz musicians
21st-century American saxophonists
21st-century American women musicians
Erica